Aphasia is an all-female heavy metal/hard rock band from Japan. Their latest release is  Ever-lasting Blue.

Discography 
 Mirage on the Ice (1999)
 Wings of Fire (2001)
 Labyrinth in My Heart (2003)
 Wild and Innocent (2004)
 Mirage (2005; EP)
 Gambler (2006)
 Sweet Illusion (2009; EP)
 Ever-lasting Blue (2017)

References

External links 
Aphasia's official website
A Tribute to Aphasia

Japanese heavy metal musical groups
Japanese rock music groups
All-female bands
Japanese hard rock musical groups